Greenmeadows is a suburb of the city of Napier, in the Hawke's Bay region of New Zealand's eastern North Island. It is part of the Taradale ward of Napier and was part of the earlier Taradale Borough.

Anderson Park, used from 1886 to 1960 by the Napier Park Racing Club, is now a passive recreation park.

Demographics

Greenmeadows had a population of 5,562 at the 2018 New Zealand census, an increase of 171 people (3.2%) since the 2013 census, and an increase of 417 people (8.1%) since the 2006 census. There were 2,337 households, comprising 2,526 males and 3,033 females, giving a sex ratio of 0.83 males per female, with 840 people (15.1%) aged under 15 years, 822 (14.8%) aged 15 to 29, 2,256 (40.6%) aged 30 to 64, and 1,644 (29.6%) aged 65 or older.

Ethnicities were 89.1% European/Pākehā, 11.9% Māori, 1.6% Pacific peoples, 5.1% Asian, and 1.4% other ethnicities. People may identify with more than one ethnicity.

The percentage of people born overseas was 16.1, compared with 27.1% nationally.

Although some people chose not to answer the census's question about religious affiliation, 50.6% had no religion, 38.3% were Christian, 1.0% had Māori religious beliefs, 0.5% were Hindu, 0.2% were Muslim, 0.6% were Buddhist and 1.5% had other religions.

Of those at least 15 years old, 789 (16.7%) people had a bachelor's or higher degree, and 1,080 (22.9%) people had no formal qualifications. 687 people (14.5%) earned over $70,000 compared to 17.2% nationally. The employment status of those at least 15 was that 2,025 (42.9%) people were employed full-time, 702 (14.9%) were part-time, and 87 (1.8%) were unemployed.

Education 
Greenmeadows has three schools:

Rolls are as of

References

Suburbs of Napier, New Zealand